Saponé may refer to:

Saponé, Burkina Faso
Saponé, Togo